Cartel is an Indian action-drama web series produced by Ekta Kapoor under the banner of Balaji Telefilms. It stars Supriya Pathak, Rithvik Dhanjani, Jitendra Joshi, Tanuj Virwani and Divya Agarwal. It was released on 20 August 2021.

Plot 
The story revolves around 5 gang-lords of Mumbai. Khan, Anna, Angre, Gajraj and a mysterious movie producer form 5 gangs who rule the low-profile underworld in the city of dreams. While all 5 gangs operate in different parts of the city, order and harmony is ensured only due to one Iron lady, Rani Maai who sits on a throne and looks over the smooth functioning of events.

Cast
Supriya Pathak as Rani Mai
 Rithvik Dhanjani as Abhay Angre
 Tanuj Virwani as Ex-Major Arjun Mhatre/ Major Bhau
 Divya Agarwal as Grizzey
 Jitendra Joshi as Madhukar Mhatre/ Madhu Mhatre
Monica Dogra as Maya
 Samir Soni as Dorabjee
Shubhrajyoti Barat as Gajraj
Sushrii Mishra as Vaidehi
 Tannishtha Chatterjee as Romilla
 Girija Oak as Rama
 Pranati Rai Prakash as Sumi
 Krishna Kaul as Javed
 Aditi Vasudev as Shweta
 Mayur More as Chiru
Gaurav Sharma as ACP Dixit
Kannan Arunachalam as Anna
 Vibhav Roy
 Nabeel Ahmed
 Aanchal Goswami
 Amey Wagh as Dhawal
Riya Sobudh
 Sanaya Pithawalla as Shreya
 Mrinal Dutt as Yograj
 Anil George as Khan
 Ashwath Bhatt as Chairman
 Mrinal Das as Suraj

Release
The official trailer of the web series was launched on 1 August 2021 by MX Player on YouTube.

Reception 
Joginder Tuteja for ABP News rated 4 stars out of 5 and wrote "Cartel is an impressive show and rest assured, the work would have begun on the sequel due to the inherent dramatic quotient that it carries. An epic gangster drama, it works immensely due to the family set up which makes it different from usual underworld affairs." Sukanya Verma of Rediff rated only 1 star out of 5 stars and wrote "There's no tension, no thrills, no logic, no humour, no darkness and not an iota of entertainment." Bharathi Pradhan for Lehren gave 3 stars out of 5 and wrote "A starlet’s death which evokes remarks that followed the suicide of a famous star last year, a birthday party held at gun point, a wedding anniversary, family celebrations and loss of lives at every turn, keep the story moving." Archika Khurana for The Times of India "In a nutshell, if the gang wars are your thing, this ‘Cartel’ will provide plenty of murder, slaughter and gunfights."

References

External links

ALTBalaji original programming
Indian drama web series
2021 web series debuts
Hindi-language web series